Rajko Grčević is a Yugoslav former football goalkeeper.

Club career
Born in Šibenik, he started playing in local HNK Šibenik from where he transferred to FK Partizan in 1948 where he played as a reserve goalkeeper for the next two seasons. In 1950 he moved to NK Lokomotiva where he got the spot of main goalkeeper and stayed there until 1954 when he moved to Odred Ljubljana where he finished his career.

He joined Partizan in December 1947 and stayed until November 1950. He played mostly at friendly games and for the reserves team, and menaged to gather 5 league appearances for the first team. He couldn't play more as the main goalkeeper at Partizan at that time was the national team goalkeeper Franjo Šoštarić. In total Grčević played 116 times for Partizan, of which 5 were in league and one in Yugoslac Cup.

References

Year of birth missing
Possibly living people
Sportspeople from Šibenik
Association football goalkeepers
Yugoslav footballers
HNK Šibenik players
FK Partizan players
NK Lokomotiva Zagreb players
NK Olimpija Ljubljana (1945–2005) players
Yugoslav First League players